Robert Vernon Schuller (born July 28, 1981) is an American humanitarian, author, television producer, and a Presbyterian minister. He serves as lead pastor on the Hour of Power television program and is the senior pastor of Shepherd's Grove church in Irvine, California. He is the grandson of Robert H. Schuller. 

Shepherd's Grove is a church in the Presbyterian Church (USA). It is associated with the former Crystal Cathedral Ministries in Garden Grove, California.

Life and career

Schuller was born in San Juan Capistrano, California, in 1981. His parents divorced when he was a young child. His father is an ordained minister in the Reformed Church in America. In high school he moved with his mother from Los Angeles to Tulsa, Oklahoma, where he met his wife and attended university. They were married in 2003. 

Schuller graduated from Oral Roberts University in 2003 with a Bachelor of Science in business and received a Master of Divinity degree from Fuller Theological Seminary in 2008. He was highly influenced and mentored by University of Southern California philosopher Dallas Willard who would speak at Schuller's church. 

In 2008, Schuller planted and served as pastor of the Tree of Life Community Church in Orange, California, meeting at an American Legion beer hall. When receiving criticism for holding worship services in a bar and making church flyers on matchbooks, Schuller commented he was "trying to reach people that didn't typically go to a normal church".

Schuller has been an outspoken advocate for human rights and the homeless in Southern California. He is president of the St. Patrick Project, a social services outreach in Orange County. He also leads Irvine Feeds the World, a network of churches that packs and sends millions of meals to the hungry in developing countries.

He has been a regular television guest on shows such as TLC's The Messengers, 100 Huntley Street, and Freeform.

He served as the youngest chaplain in the Chautauqua Institute's (Chautauqua, New York) 150th history.

Literature
Schuller is the author of the national best-selling book Imagine Happiness, published in 2012. Schuller is also the author of Happiness According to Jesus, published in 2015.

Personal life

Schuller resides in Costa Mesa, California, with his wife and two children. Schuller's son Cohen has a chronic rare brain disease called polymicrogyria which causes epilepsy and intellectual delay.

References

External links
Shepherd's Grove Presbyterian Church official website

1981 births
Living people
American Calvinist and Reformed ministers
American television evangelists
People from Orange, California
Schuller family